Daniel "Danny" Tannenbaum, known professionally as Bekon (sometimes stylized as Bēkon), previously known as Danny Keyz, is a singer, record producer and songwriter, and composer.

Career 
As Danny Keyz, he collaborated closely with his mentor DJ Khalil, contributing music to Eminem's album Recovery including working on the tracks "25 to Life" and "Almost Famous", Dr. Dre's song "Kush" and Drake's single "Fear". He also collaborated with the producer Emile Haynie on Emeli Sandé's "My Kind of Love".

Bekon provided composition and instrumentation for the Lecrae album Gravity, which won the Grammy Award for Best Gospel Album in 2012. He also provided production and vocals for at least eight tracks on Kendrick Lamar's album Damn, which went on to win a Grammy Award and Pulitzer Prize in 2018, and production and composition for H.E.R's album I Used to Know Her- nominated for a Grammy Award in 2020. His own album, Get with the Times, was released in 2018.

In 2017, after being credited with providing production and additional vocals for Kendrick Lamar's Damn, Bekon's identity was revealed to be Daniel Tannenbaum.

Discography

Solo albums

Songs produced, written, or performed on by Bekon

References 

Singers from New York (state)
American hip hop singers